Blons is a municipality in the district of Bludenz in Austrian state of Vorarlberg.

Population

See also
1954 Blons avalanches

References

Cities and towns in Bludenz District